Humboldt Airport  is located  south of Humboldt, Saskatchewan, Canada.

See also 
List of airports in Saskatchewan

References 

Registered aerodromes in Saskatchewan
Humboldt No. 370, Saskatchewan
Humboldt, Saskatchewan